Joseph C. Clifton (October 31, 1908 – December 24, 1967) was a naval officer and aviator of the United States Navy in World War II, ultimately advancing to the rank of rear admiral before his retirement in 1963.

Biography
Clifton was born in Paducah, Kentucky. He attended the University of Kentucky in 1926 and graduated from the United States Naval Academy, where he was an All-Eastern fullback, in 1930. Clifton was assigned to the battleship  and was designated a Naval Aviator in 1932. 

He served with a number of ships and flying squadrons, including the VF-2 "Flying Chiefs". During this period, he flew a captured A6M2 Zero, obtaining valuable technical data that was used to refine fighter tactics against the Japanese.

He led the joint British-American air attack force during the Operation Cockpit raid on Sabang.

In 1945, he was officer-in-charge of fighter indoctrination in Advanced Training, at Naval Air Station, Green Cove Springs, Florida.

Clifton was assigned to the Air Warfare Division Office from 1946–49, and the Fleet Logistics Support Wing, Pacific Area, 1949.

Clifton was deputy chief of staff training and Staff Commander, Air Forces, Pacific Fleet, 1952–53; attended the Naval War College Class of 1954; commander of Naval Air Station Memphis, 1954–56; and commander of Barrier Atlantic, and also Airborne Early Warning Wing Atlantic and Fleet Air Detachment, Argentia, 1956–58. From 1958 to 1960, he headed the Naval Air Advanced Training Command, and in 1960 commanded Carrier Division 7, the Seventh Fleet. He was chief of naval air technical training at Memphis before finally retiring in July 1963.

After retirement, he became associated with Litton Industries in Beverly Hills, California.

Clifton died following complications from diabetes on Christmas Eve, 1967, in Santa Monica, California.

Clifton's life is commemorated with a street bearing his name in his hometown of Paducah, Kentucky.

Awards
For his service in World War II, Clifton was awarded the Distinguished Flying Cross, with gold star, the Legion of Merit twice, the Air Medal, and the British Distinguished Service Order.

He was named to the University of Kentucky Hall of Distinguished Alumni in February 1965, and to the Naval Aviation Hall of Honor in 1996.

Joseph C. Clifton Award
The Joseph C. Clifton Trophy was awarded for the first time in 1968, to VF-51. The award recognizes meritorious achievement by a fighter squadron while deployed aboard a carrier.

The award is in memory of Rear Admiral Clifton, who distinguished himself as a fighter pilot during World War II. His heroism and extraordinary achievements in flight paralleled the aggressive attitude and drive and inspiring leadership he displayed throughout his life.  This award recognizes meritorious achievement by a fighter squadron. The trophy, sponsored by Litton Industries, is a 22-inch high hand repoussé silver bowl on a walnut base.

References

External links
 "AIR: From the Snare of the Fowler", TIME, July 10, 1944
Joseph Clinton Clifton Papers, 1926-1971 MS 204 held by Special Collection & Archives , Nimitz Library  at the United States Naval Academy 

1908 births
1967 deaths
United States Navy rear admirals
United States Naval Aviators
United States Navy pilots of World War II
United States Navy personnel of World War II
United States Navy personnel of the Korean War
Recipients of the Distinguished Flying Cross (United States)
Recipients of the Legion of Merit
Recipients of the Air Medal
Companions of the Distinguished Service Order